Jessica Lovering is an American astrophysicist, researcher and Director of Energy at the Breakthrough Institute. She supports the innovative development of new nuclear power plants in response to climate change. She also sits on the Advisory Committee of the Nuclear Innovation Alliance, and was a speaker at Nuclear Innovation Bootcamp at the University of California, Berkeley in 2016. Her biography at ClimateOne states that Lovering "works to  change how people think about energy and the environment". Her written work has featured in various publications, including journals Issues in Science and Technology, Science and Public Policy, Foreign Affairs and Energy policy. Websites featuring her work include various nuclear energy blogs and EnergyPost.eu. She has worked as a researcher on the documentary film Pandora's Promise and appeared in the TV series Abandoned.

References 

Nuclear power
American astrophysicists
Living people
Year of birth missing (living people)